The Northeastern University College of Engineering (COE) is the engineering school of Northeastern University in Boston, Massachusetts. It offers Bachelor of Science (BS), Master of Science (MS) and doctoral degrees, as well as graduate certificates, in a variety of engineering fields, as well as undergraduate and graduate degrees in interdisciplinary and engineering fields. It is by the accredited by the Engineering Accreditation Commission of ABET

History 

An engineering department was first established around 1901 as part of the evening educational program at the Boston Young Men's Christian Association (YMCA). The variety in engineering courses was meant to prepare men for work in engineering and industrial design. A Co-operative School of Engineering, the institution's first day school, was formed in 1909. Carl Ell, a future president of Northeastern, joined the engineering faculty after graduate work at Massachusetts Institute of Technology (MIT) in 1910. He became head of Northeastern's civil engineering department two years later and dean of the School of Engineering in 1917. In his first year as dean, he nearly doubled the size of the cooperative education, or co-op, engineering student body from 160 to 235 and the number of co-op engineering industries from 27 to 42. Ell was credited with transforming Northeastern's campus and making its cooperative education, or co-op, program, originally an option within the engineering school, an integral part of the university-wide curriculum.

In 1920, the engineering school received degree-granting powers. In 1936, however, the school failed to receive accreditation largely due to cramped classrooms and inadequate laboratory facilities at the Huntington Avenue YMCA building, but also because its four-year curriculum that included the co-op experience was deemed too short. As a result, 
a new governing body, the Northeastern University Corporation with an independent board of trustees, was created to give the Boston YMCA less control over the university. The curriculum of the engineering school, which by that time included civil, mechanical, electrical, industrial and chemical engineering programs, was expanded to five years. And the university constructed its first campus building, Richards Hall. By 1960, enrollment at the College of Engineering had reach 2,734 students, making it the largest undergraduate engineering program in New England and one of the largest in the country. Eventually, the engineering school moved into its own space, designed by Keyes and Associates, in 1983.

Campus 
Centrally located on Northeastern’s Boston campus, the College of Engineering is housed in the Snell Engineering Center. George Snell, a 1941 alumnus, and his wife, Lorraine, donated money to establish the facility. The building occupies the same area where the first World Series baseball game was played in 1903.

In 2017, Northeastern opened a state-of-the-art interdisciplinary facility in Boston's Roxbury neighborhood on Columbus Avenue. The Interdisciplinary Science and Engineering Complex (ISEC) includes wet and dry laboratory facilities, classroom and office space, a 280-seat auditorium and a large atrium with a spiral staircase totaling  of space to accommodate approximately 700 faculty and graduate students. The construction of the six-story facility is part of the university’s ongoing effort to expand its research across disciplines. A second  eight-story research building, called EXP, is to be located west of the first building on Columbus Avenue and will contain labs, a cafe and a faculty club.

Academics 
The College of Engineering offers 65 undergraduate and graduate engineering degree programs at the BS, MS and PhD levels, in addition to a wide range of minors and graduate certificates, including the Gordon Engineering Leadership Program which can be combined with any master’s degree. Undergraduate students can participate in the PlusOne accelerated master’s degree program. In addition to the Boston campus, some graduate programs are offered at the university's satellite campus locations.

Beginning in 1909, the College of Engineering was the first school at Northeastern to offer the co-op program. The co-op program gives undergraduate and graduate students an opportunity to work within their profession for four, six, or eight-month periods as part of their educational experience. Co-op positions are available locally and globally, and for industry and research positions.

Departments 
The College of Engineering contains five departments:
 Bioengineering Department
 Chemical Engineering Department
 Civil & Environmental Engineering Department
 Electrical & Computer Engineering Department
 Mechanical & Industrial Engineering Department

Rankings
The College of Engineering's engineering programs are highly ranked by U.S. News & World Report as some of the best engineering programs in America. The magazine's 2022 edition of the Best Engineering Schools in the United States ranked the college #31 in nation. In 2015, Business Insider ranked the college #29 on its list of the 50 best computer science and engineering schools in America.

Research 

A major goal of Northeastern engineers is to lead the way in interdisciplinary research. Collaborations between biologists, chemists, physicists, geologists and physicians seek new answers to problems like tumor detection, soil remediation and emissions control. Some of these explorations with industrial partners have been instrumental in making better products in industries from telecommunications to automotive manufacturing.

The College of Engineering is home to thirteen primary research centers:
 Awareness and Localization of Explosives-Related Threats (ALERT)
 Bernard M. Gordon Center for Subsurface Sensing and Imaging Systems (CenSSIS)
 Beyond Traffic Innovation Center
 Center for High-rate Nanomanufacturing (CHN)
 Center for Integrative Biomedical Computing (CIBC)
 Center for Research on Early Childhood Exposure and Development in Puerto Rico (CRECE)
 Center for Translational Applications of Nanoscale Multiferroic Systems (TANMS)
 Center for Ultra-wide-area Resilient Electric Energy Transmission Networks (CURENT)
 Healthcare Systems Engineering Institute (HSyE)
 Institute for Chemical Imaging of Living Systems
 Institute for Experiential Robotics
 Institute for the Wireless Internet of Things
 Institute of Information Assurance (IIA)
 Northeastern SMART
 Puerto Rico Testsite for Exploring Contamination Threats (PROTECT)
 Versatile Onboard Traffic Embedded Roaming Sensors (VOTERS)

In addition to these centers, COE has several major research initiatives and facilities.

References

External links
 College of Engineering website
 Northeastern University website

Northeastern University
Educational institutions established in 1909
Engineering schools and colleges in the United States
Engineering universities and colleges in Massachusetts
1909 establishments in Massachusetts